Senator Cavanaugh

John Joseph Cavanaugh III (born 1945), Nebraska State Senate
Machaela Cavanaugh (born 1979), Nebraska State Senate

See also
Daniel Cavanagh (politician) (1830–1901), Wisconsin State Senate
Senator Kavanagh (disambiguation)